The Texas Women's Open is a golf tournament, played in the Fort Worth, Texas area. From 1950 to 1954, it was an LPGA Tour event, although it was first played in 1933. It was revived by the North Texas section of the PGA of America in 2001. It was played at several courses in Fort Worth from 1933 to 1955 and in the Dallas–Fort Worth metroplex since 2001. The 2020 event featured a stronger than normal field as several LPGA Tour players competed due to the Tour hiatus caused by the COVID-19 pandemic.

Tournament locations

Winners

Texas Women's Open
2021 Kenzie Wright
2020 Céline Boutier
2019 Savannah Vilaubi
2018 Marissa Chow
2017 Chirapat Jao-Javanil
2016 Savannah Vilaubi
2015 Maddie McCrary (a)
2014 Ashley Knoll
2013 Christi Cano
2012 Jody Fleming
2011 Ashley Tait
2010 Cindy Figg-Currier
2009 Katy Jarochowicz
2008 Tanya Wahdwa (a)
2007 Shannon Fish (a)
2006 Carolyn Creekmore (a)
2005 Randi Meadows
2004 Mina Hardin (a)
2003 Lori Sutherland
2002 Tara Bateman
2001 Tara Bateman

Women's Texas Open
1956–2000 No tournament
1955 Polly Riley (a)
1954 Betsy Rawls
1953 Betsy Rawls
1952 Babe Zaharias
1951 Babe Zaharias
1950 Beverly Hanson (a)
1949 Beverly Hanson (a)
1948 Polly Riley (a)
1947 Betty Jameson (a)
1946 Babe Zaharias (a)
1945 Babe Zaharias (a)
1942–1944 No tournament due to World War II
1941 Aniela Gorczyca Goldthwaite
1940 Babe Zaharias (a)
1939 Kathryn Hemphill
1938 Betty Jameson (a)
1937 Aniela Gorczyca Goldthwaite
1936 Edna Saenger
1935 Aniela Gorczyca

Fort Worth Women's Invitation 
1934 Mrs. Tom Wallace
1933 Aniela Gorczyca

(a) – amateur

References

External links
Texas Women's Open Past Champions

Former LPGA Tour events
State Open golf tournaments
Golf in Texas
Sports in the Dallas–Fort Worth metroplex
Women in Texas